Māturīdism or Māturīdī theology (: al-Māturīdiyyah) is one of the main Sunnī schools of Islamic theology, founded by the Persian Muslim scholar, Ḥanafī jurist, reformer (mujaddid), and scholastic theologian Abū Manṣūr al-Māturīdī in the 9th–10th century.

Al-Māturīdī codified and systematized the theological Islamic beliefs already present among the Ḥanafite Muslim theologians of Balkh and Transoxania under one school of systematic theology (kalām); he emphasized the use of rationality and theological rationalism regarding the interpretation of the sacred scriptures of Islam. Māturīdī theology is considered one of the orthodox creeds of Sunnī Islam alongside the Aṯharī and Ashʿarī, and prevails in the Ḥanafī school of Islamic jurisprudence.

Māturīdism was originally circumscribed to the region of Transoxania in Central Asia but it became the predominant theological orientation amongst the Sunnī Muslims of Persia before the Safavid conversion to Shīʿīsm in the 16th century, and the Ahl al-Ray (people of reason). It enjoyed a preeminent status in the Ottoman Empire and Mughal India. Outside the old Ottoman and Mughal empires, most Turkic tribes, Hui people, Central Asian, and South Asian Muslims also follow the Māturīdī theology. There have also been Arab Māturīdī scholars.

Beliefs and creed

Abū Manṣūr al-Māturīdī, being a follower of the Ḥanafī school of Islamic jurisprudence, based his theological opinions and epistemological perspectives on the teachings of the school's eponymous founder, Abū Ḥanīfa al-Nuʿmān (8th century CE).

The Māturīdī school of Islamic theology holds that:
 All the attributes of God are eternal and not separated from God.
 Ethics have an objective existence and humans are capable of recognizing it through reason alone.
 Although humans are intellectually capable of realizing God, they need revelations and guidance of prophets and messengers, because human desire can divert the intellect and because certain knowledge of God has been specially given to these prophets (e.g. the Quran was revealed to Muhammad according to Islam, who Muslims believe was given this special knowledge from God and only through Muhammad did this knowledge become accessible to others).
 Humans are free in determining their actions within scope of God-given possibilities. Accordingly, God has created all possibilities, but humans are free to choose.
 The Six articles of faith.
 Religious authorities need reasonable arguments to prove their claims.
 Support of science and falsafa (philosophy).
 The Māturīdites state that imān (faith) does not increase nor decrease depending on one's deeds; it's rather taqwā (piety) which increases and decreases.
 The Māturīdites emphasize the importance of monotheism.

Regarding ʿaqīdah (creed), unlike many Aṯharīs (traditionalistic theologians), al-Māturīdī doesn't hold that angels are necessarily infallible. Pointing at Surah al-Baqara, he notes that angels too, have been tested. Referring to Surah al-Anbiyāʼ, he points out, angels who claim divinity for themselves are sentenced to hell. About Iblīs, otherwise known as Satan, he states, disputing whether he was an angel or a jinn before his fall is useless, as it is more important to know, that he has become a devil and enemy of humans.

Māturīdism holds that humans are creatures endowed with reason, which differentiates them from animals. The relationship between people and God differs from that of nature and God; humans are endowed with free-will, but due to God's sovereignty, God creates the acts the humans choose, so humans can perform them. Ethics can be understood just by rational thought and don't need prophetic guidance. Al-Māturīdī also considered the ḥadīth to be unreliable when they are at odds with reason. Furthermore, Māturīdī theology opposes anthropomorphism and similitude, but simultaneously does not deny the divine attributes.

Māturīdism defends the idea that paradise and hell are coexisting with the temporal world, against the assertion of some Muʿtazila that paradise and hell will be created only after the Day of Judgement. The attributes of paradise and hell would already take effect on this world (dunya). Abū l-Laiṯ as-Samarqandī (944–983 CE) stated that the purpose of simultaneous existence of both worlds is that they inspire hope and fear among humans.

Concept of faith 

Al-Māturīdī's doctrine, primarily based on Ḥanafī theology and jurisprudence, asserted man's capacity and will alongside the supremacy of God in man's acts, providing a doctrinal framework for more flexibility and adaptability. Māturīdism especially flourished and spread among the Muslim populations in Central Asia from the 10th century onwards.

According to Māturīdism, belief (ʾīmān) does neither increase nor decrease depending on observation of religious law. Instead, deeds follow from faith. Based on Surah Ṭā Hā (verse 112), if a Muslim does not perform the deeds prescribed by the Islamic law (sharīʿa), he is not considered an apostate as long as he doesn't deny his obligations. According to al-Māturīdi, faith isn't based on actions or confession, but comes from the heart. He supports his doctrine by referring to Surah al-ʿImrān (verse 3:22): "They are the ones whose deeds have become worthless in this world and the Hereafter, and for them there will be no helpers." These people would have performed the obligatory actions and rituals without the proper faith in their heart. Therefore, actions must be based on faith to be acceptable before God. 

Similarly, it is argued that the obedience to God observed by angels and prophets derives from their insights to God's nature and doesn't result from their creation. Abū al-Qāsim al-Ḥakīm al-Samarqandī (9th to 10th centuries CE) drew an analogy on Harut and Marut, who are regarded as sinful yet not unbelievers (Kuffār) in the Islamic tradition. Al-Samarqandī further stated that children cannot be considered unbelievers and all of them go to paradise. According to al-Māturīdī, human rationality is supposed to acknowledge the existence of a creator deity (bāriʾ) solely based on rational thought and independently from divine revelation. He shared this conviction with his teacher and predecessor Abū Ḥanīfa al-Nuʿmān (8th century CE), whereas the 10th-century Muslim scholar and theologian Abū al-Ḥasan al-Ashʿarī never held such a view.

Yohei Matsuyama points to al-Māturīdī's wording about faith, referring to the only obligation to believe in a creator (bāriʾ) or maker (sanī), not specifically in Allah, and concludes, it is only necessary for salvation to construct a belief in a creator, not necessarily accepting the theological or doctrinal formulations of Islam. Toshihiko Izutsu likewise argues that "believing in islam" refers to submission to the creator, by voluntarily surrendering to his will, and not necessarily accepting a religious formula.

Yet, al-Māturīdī did not view all religions as equal. He criticized Christians, Jews, Zoroastrians, and atheists or materialists (Dahrīya). However, he drew a distinction between other Abrahamic monotheistic religions and non-Abrahamic non-monotheistic religions, criticizing Judaism and Christianity on the matter of prophecy and individual prophets, not about God. Dualistic religions faced criticism by al-Māturīdī regarding their conception of God, arguing that an omnibenevolent deity, who creates only good, opposed to a devil, who is responsible for everything evil, implies a deficit in God's omnipotence and is incompatible with God's nature.

Geographical spread 
Particularly and inextricably, Maturidism is closely linked to the Hanafi school of law. Therefore, where there are Hanafis, there are Maturidis. Maturidism was initially spread in the Eastern realms of the Islamic world, particularly in Samarqand and Transoxania. It became widespread among Turkic peoples in Central Asia and was introduced into the Middle East with the coming of the Seljuks. It was popular among the Arabicized Persians of eastern Khurasan and was the preferred school of the Central Asian and Ottoman Turks. From its central Asian origins, it spread all over the lands of Islam, from Egypt in the west to China and India in the east. In this capacity, at least during the High Middle Ages. Wilferd Madelung explains the connection between the earlier Seljuk Turks, Hanafi law, and Maturidi theology:  Currently, Maturidis are widespread in Afghanistan, Central Asia, Turkey, India, Pakistan, Bangladesh, the Balkans (especially Bosnia, Albania, Kosovo and Skopje), northwestern China, the Levant (especially Syria, Lebanon and Palestine), the Caucasus, Tatarstan, and Bashkortostan.

See also
 2020 International Maturidi Conference
 2016 international conference on Sunni Islam in Grozny
 Athari
 Islamic schools and branches
 List of Ash'aris and Maturidis
 Muʿtazila

References

External links
An article from a Turkish site
  Biography of Imâm Al Mâturîdî (by at-tawhid.net)
 The Place of Reason in the Theologies of al-Maturidi and al-Ash'ari (Dissertation)

 
Maturidis
History of Islam
Islamic philosophical schools
Islamic terminology
Islamic theology
Kalam
Sunni Islam
Sunni Islamic branches